Soccer Intellectuals Ladies Football Club is a Ghanaian professional women's football club based in Ajumako - Assasan, within the Ajumako-Enyan-Esiam District in the Central Region of Ghana. The club features in the Ghana Women’s Premier League. The club is a founding member of the league.

Grounds 
The club plays their home matches at the Kofi Assansa Park in Ajumako.

Notable players 
In the 2020–21 season, Mary Essiful captained the side.

References

External links 

 Official Website
 Soccer Intellectuals Ladies on Twitter

Women's football clubs in Ghana